The 1946 United States Senate election in Maryland was held on November 5, 1946.

Incumbent Democratic Senator George L. P. Radcliffe ran for a third consecutive term in office, but lost the Democratic primary to Governor of Maryland Herbert O'Conor. O'Conor narrowly defeated Republican D. John Markey to win the open seat. 

O'Conor's general election victory and the subsequent recount by a federal Senate Subcommittee were controversial, with each party claiming partisan manipulation by the other.

Democratic primary

Candidates
John Emerson LaVeck
 Herbert O'Conor, Governor of Maryland
 George L. P. Radcliffe, incumbent Senator since 1935

Results

Republican primary

Candidates
 D. John Markey, businessman, U.S. Army veteran, and former Maryland Agricultural College football coach
Roscoe F. Walter
 Joseph Allison Wilmer

Results

General election

Results

After the vote, both candidates claimed victory, before the official count declared O'Conor the winner by a margin of 2,232 out of more than 470,000 votes cast. On December 10, 1946, Markey requested the U.S. Senate Special Committee to Investigate Senatorial Campaign Expenditures (now controlled by Republicans after their landslide victories in the 1946 elections) conduct a recount in Baltimore City and Montgomery County, which had used electronic voting machines. He also alleged the O'Conor campaign had committed financing violations. The committee agreed because Maryland was unable to conduct its own official recount and found a variation of about 400 votes. The committee then sought to survey five additional counties that were likely to have irregularities. Markey requested a full recount of the entire state.

In the meantime, O'Conor was sworn into the Senate seat on January 4, 1947, after a slight delay. Throughout the recounts, Markey implored the process be done quickly, and implied that the election evidence could go missing at any moment. In May 1947, upon completion of the recount of the five additional counties, O'Conor still maintained a margin of 1,465 votes. 

In the aftermath, Markey complained of the O'Conor administration's control of the state government, the Democratic Party's control of the state since 1864, and law enforcement's failure to prevent polling abuses. By contrast, Democratic Maryland senator Millard Tydings alleged partisan bias on the part of the Republican-led investigating subcommittee. The committee completed its full recount of the state in January 1948, and concluded that O'Conor had secured a 1,624-vote majority.

Results by county

Counties that flipped from Democrat to Republican
Allegany
Anne Arundel
Baltimore (County)
Carroll
Frederick
Somerset
Talbot
Washington

Counties that flipped from Republican to Democrat
Cecil
Harford
St. Mary's

See also
1946 United States Senate elections
1946 United States elections

References

Notes

1946
Maryland
United States Senate